Erminio Piserchia (born 12 January 1964) is an Italian-Swiss football manager and former player who played as a defender. A long time member of BSC Young Boys coaching staff, including stints as caretaker manager, he is currently assistant coach of Grasshopper Club Zürich.

References

1964 births
Living people
Swiss men's footballers
Association football defenders
FC Concordia Basel players
Grasshopper Club Zürich players
FC Laufen players
FC St. Gallen players
FC Lugano players
Swiss Super League players
Swiss football managers
BSC Young Boys managers